Dobrogost or Dobrohost is an old Slavic origin given name derived from the elements dobro ("kind, good") and gost ("guest, hospitality"). Notable people with the name include:

Jan Dobrogost Krasiński, Polish nobleman (szlachcic)
Dobrogost Ostroróg, castellan of Gniezno
a pseudonym of Polish writer Franciszek Ksawery Godebski

See also
Slavic names

External links
 http://www.behindthename.com/name/dobrogost

Slavic masculine given names
Polish masculine given names